Lohr is a surname. Notable people with the surname include:

 Aaron Lohr (born 1976), American actor
 August Lohr (1842–1920), Austrian painter
 Bob Lohr (born 1960), American golfer
 David Lohr, (born 1974), American writer
 Ellen Lohr (born 1965), German race driver
 Eric Lohr, American historian
 Howard Lohr (1892-1977), American baseball player
 Ina Lohr (1903–1983), Swiss composer
 Jerry Lohr (born 1937), American real estate developer
 Jim Lohr (1934–2017), American football player
 John Lohr (born 1961), Canadian politician
 Lenox R. Lohr (1891–1968), American businessman
 Marie Lohr (1890-1975), Australian actress
 Matt Lohr (born 1971), American politician
 Michael F. Lohr (born 1952), American Navy admiral
 Rob Lohr (born 1990), American football player
 Sharon Lohr, American statistician

See also
 Loher (disambiguation)
 Lohr (disambiguation)
 Löhr, a surname